Gandepalle Mandal is one of the 21 mandals in Kakinada District of Andhra Pradesh. As per census 2011, there are 13 villages.

Demographics 
Gandepalle Mandal has total population of 54,278 as per the Census 2011 out of which 27,075 are males while 27,203 are females and the average Sex Ratio of Gandepalle Mandal is 1,005. The total literacy rate of Gandepalle Mandal is 59.69%. The male literacy rate is 54.88% and the female literacy rate is 52.21%.

Towns & Villages

Villages 

Borrampalem
Gandepalle
Mallepalle
Murari
North Tirupathi Rajapuram
P.Nayakampalle
Pro. Ragampeta
Singarampalem
Surampalem
Talluru
Uppalapadu
Yellamilli
Yerrampalem

See also 
List of mandals in Andhra Pradesh

References 

Mandals in Kakinada district
Mandals in Andhra Pradesh